Sargeant may refer to:

People
Sargeant (surname), a list of people with the surname

Places
Sargeant, Minnesota, U.S.
Sargeant Township, Mower County, Minnesota, U.S.

See also
Sergeant, a senior enlisted military rank
Sergeant (disambiguation)
Sargent (disambiguation)